This is the list of the members of the Parliament of Finland between May 1, 1924 – September 1, 1927 following the parliamentary election held April 1–2, 1924. The elections were originally scheduled be held in August 1925; but after the Socialist Workers Party had been outlawed and its members arrested, the Parliament only had 173 members instead of 200. Disagreement between President Ståhlberg and Prime Minister Kallio on the question of early elections caused the latter to resign. The new caretaker cabinet led by Aimo Cajander then ordered disbandment of the Parliament and early elections.

The elections did not cause major changes to the Finnish political landscape. The communists—in the form of Socialist Workers' and Small Farmers' Election Alliance—lost 9 seats, majority of which were gained by Social Democratic Party of Finland. Together the parties on the left had only 78 seats, less than ever before. Social Democrats remained the largest group in Parliament with 60 seats, followed by Agrarian Party and National Coalition Party. Among the 200 members of the Parliament were 17 women (8.5%).

Kyösti Kallio acted as Speaker of the Parliament of Finland until he became Minister in March 1925. Wäinö Wuolijoki was then the Speaker 1925–26 and Paavo Virkkunen 1926–27.

Only the first of the four cabinets formed during this parliament had a majority, and it too lost its majority when the Agrarian Party withdraw from cabinet following a disagreement on pensions of government officials. The Ingman cabinet finally resigned four months after that due to defeat of the election bill.

As neither National Progressive Party nor Swedish People's Party were willing to enter the new cabinet due to their disappointment with the election bill, Antti Tulenheimo formed a minority cabinet between National Coalition and Agrarian Parties. After this cabinet had resigned due to question of national defense funding, Kyösti Kallio headed another cabinet formed on the same basis.

The fourth and last cabinet formed during this Parliament and led by Väinö Tanner is important in the Finnish political history for several reasons. It was the first time the largest party in Finland, the Social Democrats, had participated in a cabinet during the time Finland had been independent, and also only the second time in the history of the Parliament of Finland after the Tokoi senate in 1917. It also had Finland's first female minister, Miina Sillanpää.

Members of the Parliament 1924–1927
In the table, the names written with italics were appointed to the Parliament later than May 1, 1924—the first day of the new Parliament—to replace those who had died or resigned. The names are given here as in the membership roll of the Parliament; for example the name Svento is used instead of Sventorzetski even though the latter version was used until 1938.

Notes

References

1924